Phyllis Margaret Rountree (13 January 1911 – 27 July 1994) was an Australian microbiologist and bacteriologist. She was an expert in staphylococcal infections.

Life 
Rountree was born in 1911 in Hamilton, Victoria. Her mother's brother, William Roy Hodgson was a noted diplomat, but she was inspired by her learned aunts. She went to school locally at Alexandra Ladies’ College before boarding in Hawthorn at the Tintern Church of England Girls’ Grammar School. She studied zoology and bacteriology at the University of Melbourne. She had hoped to study medicine like her aunt but her father, a pharmacist, said she was "too young". It was a chance visit to her home town by Harold Addison Woodruff that inspired Rountree and persuaded her father that she should take a master's degree and become a bacteriologist.

She completed three years of a Council of Scientific & Industrial Research fellowship in 1934 by presenting her work to Professor James A. Prescott at the Waite Agricultural Research Institute in Adelaide. He made no additions or changes but she was not offered a permanent position and she put this down to systemic gender bias. She had enjoyed the relaxed attitude there but male colleagues had not spoken to her during her work breaks and she was sure that a man successfully completing three years of research would have been retained.

In 1936 she went to London where she studied for a post-graduate Diploma in Bacteriology at the School of Hygiene. She supported herself by working at the British Public Health Laboratory and she returned to Australia the following year.

After a year of food testing during the war, she started at the Royal Prince Alfred Hospital in 1944 where she was suspected of recruiting communists. The commonwealth authorities decided she was not interested in this in the 1950s. At this time she was a recognised expert on staphylococcal infections and she had noticed a growth in the number of surgical infections. There was a concern that this might have meant a return to pre-penicillin type infections. This was not the case and she become the chief bacteriologist in 1961. She was able to control a staphylococcal outbreak at the hospital that was killing babies. It was called the "nursery epidemic" and it was resistant to antibiotics like penicillin. It was controlled by her advice of switching to blankets made from cotton and hand cleansing.

In 1971 she was appointed  Honorary Research Associate in Medical Microbiology at the University of New South Wales.

Awards
Rountree won few awards and this may have been due to her reticence or that she didn't publish all her findings.

 Life Member of the Australian Society for Microbiology
 Honorary Doctor of Science degree from the University of Sydney (1987)
 In 2021, the newly established bacteriophage family Rountreeviridae was named in honor of Phyllis Rountree.

References 

1911 births
1994 deaths
Australian bacteriologists
Women bacteriologists
University of Melbourne alumni